Clayton Township is the name of some places in the U.S. state of Michigan:

 Clayton Township, Arenac County, Michigan
 Clayton Township, Genesee County, Michigan

See also
 Clayton, Michigan, a village in Lenawee County
 Clayton Township (disambiguation)

Michigan township disambiguation pages